Local elections were held in the Indian state of Telangana in 2019 for various rural local bodies including 12,751 gram panchayats, 538 Zilla Parishad territorial constituencies, and 5,817 Mandal Parishad territorial constituencies. Gram panchayat elections were held in January 2019 whereas ZPTC and MPTC elections were held in May 2019.

Almost 4,000 new panchayats were created in 2018 which went through their first election.

Background 
The previous Telangana rural local body elections held in united Andhra Pradesh in 2013 and 2014. Previous gram panchayat elections were held in 2013, the Indian National Congress won 2,669 gram panchayats (only counting the Telangana region), followed by Telugu Desam Party with 1,838 seats, and the Telangana Rashtra Samithi with 1,635 seats. In the elections for ZPTC and MPTC in 2014, the Congress won 176 ZPTCs and 2,315 MPTCs (only counting the Telangana region), followed by TRS with 191 ZPTCs and 1,860 MPTCs, and TDP with 53 ZPTCs and 1,061 MPTCs.

Results 
The Telangana Rashtra Samithi swept the elections, winning over 60% of gram panchayats and MPTCs and over 80% of ZPTCs.

References

Telangana
Local elections in Telangana